Euxoa pallipennis is a species of cutworm or dart moth in the family Noctuidae. It is found in North America.

The MONA or Hodges number for Euxoa pallipennis is 10765.

References

Further reading

 
 
 

Euxoa
Articles created by Qbugbot
Moths described in 1888